Katrina  Zepps  (15 November 1918 – 8 July 1980) was an Australian nurse (general), nurse educator and refugee. She was born in Hlukhiv (then part of the Russian Empire now of Ukraine) and died in Turramurra, Sydney, New South Wales, Australia.

She trained at the Red Cross Hospital in Jelgava, Latvia.  Her Australian naturalisation papers were cleared while she was working in Tully, Queensland.

In 1967 she was appointed acting administrator of the New South Wales College of Nursing.

In 1977 she received an Australian MBE for her services to nursing.

References

Australian educators
Refugees in Australia
Australian Lutherans
Soviet emigrants to Australia
1918 births
1980 deaths
Australian women nurses
Australian nurses
20th-century Lutherans
Australian Members of the Order of the British Empire